The 2016–17 Quaid-e-Azam Trophy was the 59th edition of the Quaid-e-Azam Trophy, Pakistan's domestic first-class cricket competition. It was contested by 16 teams representing eight regional associations and eight departments, and ran between 1 October and 15 December 2016.

The format of the competition remained the same as the  previous season, with two round-robin group stages and a final. The regions and departments were divided evenly between the two groups for the preliminary group stage, with the four top teams in each advancing to a "Super Eight" group stage; the top team in each of the Super Eight groups contested the final. Ten of the matches, including the two Super Eight fixtures and the final, were played as day/night games, in preparation for Pakistan's tour to Australia in December 2016.

Neither PIA nor Karachi Blues were able to retain their first-class status as both were relegated at the end of the season.

The final was contested between Habib Bank Limited and Water and Power Development Authority (WAPDA). The match finished in a draw, with WAPDA declared as the winners of the tournament, because of a first-innings lead. This was WAPDA's first title in the Quaid-e-Azam Trophy. Salman Butt was the man of the match in the final after scoring a century in both innings.

Group stage

Tables

Results

Pool A

Round 1

Round 2

Round 3

Round 4

Round 5

Round 6

Round 7

Pool B

Round 1

Round 2

Round 3

Round 4

Round 5

Round 6

Round 7

Super Eight stage

Tables

Results

Group I

Group II

Final

Notes

References

External links
 Series home at ESPN Cricinfo

Domestic cricket competitions in 2016–17
2016 in Pakistani cricket
2016–17 Quaid-e-Azam Trophy
Pakistani cricket seasons from 2000–01